The Kleine Pleiße is a river in Saxony, Germany.

See also 
List of rivers of Saxony

References 

Rivers of Saxony
Rivers of Germany